Kennedy Town is the western terminus of the . The station serves the Kennedy Town area on the northwestern end of Hong Kong Island, Hong Kong.

History

Planning
When the station first appeared in Hong Kong Mass Transit: Further Studies in 1970, it was simply known as Kennedy. It was to be built as part of the Island line in the 1980s, but construction of the line did not commence westwards beyond , citing inadequate passengers and technical difficulties by contractors.

Under the latest proposal as of June 2005, Kennedy Town would be served by West Island line as an extension of the Island line, a heavy rail system, instead of being served by a medium capacity rail shared by commuters from Southern District, after pressure from local community groups.

Construction
The station was designed by TFP Farrells. The contract to construct the station and overrun tunnel was awarded to Gammon Construction (half owned by Balfour Beatty) for HK$1.34 billion. The overrun tunnel is 650 metres in length. Construction commenced in 2010 and was completed in 2014. Demolition of the swimming pool, which occupied the bulk of the station site, was underway by 2011. The re-provisioning contract for the new Kennedy Town Swimming Pool was awarded to Paul Y. Construction Company Ltd in July 2009 and was finished in 2011 near the Kennedy Town seafront.

Kennedy Town station opened on 28 December 2014.

Station layout 
The station is located under the site of the previous Kennedy Town Swimming Pool located on Smithfield. There is a public transport interchange at the ground level of the station.

West of the station, the two tracks merge into one track and there is a siding for Island line trains to change direction.

Entrances/exits
A : Smithfield (Minibus terminus)
B : Rock Hill Street, North Street
C: Forbes Street, Smithfield, Kennedy Town Playground

Community facilities

References

Kennedy Town
MTR stations on Hong Kong Island
Island line (MTR)
West Island line
Railway stations in Hong Kong opened in 2014